Sex Starved is the 7th album by Dutch psychobilly band Batmobile. It was recorded  August–September 1990 at the Commodore Studio, Zelhem, the Netherlands and released in 1991 on Count Orlock Records.

Track listing
"Uranium Love" (Jeroen Haamers) – 2:41
"S.P.O.C.K" (J. Haamers) – 1:31
"King's Evil" (J. Haamers) – 1:59
"Rock This Planet" (J. Haamers) – 2:41
"Can't Stop This Rock" (Eric Haamers, J. Haamers) – 2:26
"Roll On" (E. Haamers) – 3:03
"Police At The Door" (E. Haamers) – 2:04
"Haemorrhoid Rock" (E. Haamers) – 2:40 
"Sex Starved" (E. Haamers) – 3:34
"In Orbit" (E. Haamers) – 2:09
"The Living Have More Fun" (J. Haamers) – 2:16
"Rockin' Rooster" (J. Haamers) – 2:29
"Mean Ugly Mama" (J. Haamers) – 2:16
"Give Me Some Pussy" (J. Haamers) – 2:15

Personnel
Jeroen Haamers – lead vocals, guitar 
Eric Haamers – double bass 
Johnny Zuidhof – drums
Pieter M. Dorrenboom - cover design
Dick "Hardrockabilly" Kemper - engineering

1991 albums
Batmobile (band) albums